Kandovan District is in Mianeh County, East Azerbaijan province, Iran. At the 2006 National Census, its population was 24,820 in 5,875 households. The following census in 2011 counted 23,637 people in 6,915 households. At the latest census in 2016, the district had 21,131 inhabitants in 6,897 households.

References 

Meyaneh County

Districts of East Azerbaijan Province

Populated places in East Azerbaijan Province

Populated places in Meyaneh County